Pavel Yuryevich Tarasov (born 19 January 1985) is a former Russian professional football player.

Club career
He played in the Russian Football National League for FC Lada Togliatti in 2003.

External links
 
 

1985 births
Living people
Russian footballers
Association football goalkeepers
FC Lada-Tolyatti players
FC Tekstilshchik Kamyshin players
FC Rotor Volgograd players
FC Torpedo Moscow players
FC Nosta Novotroitsk players